Mary Jane McCallum (born 1952) is a Canadian Senator representing Manitoba.

Early life and education
McCallum was born on May 1, 1952. She attended a residential school from the age of five.  She received a Dental Nursing Diploma from the Wascana Institute of Applied Arts and Sciences in Regina, Saskatchewan, in 1977 and a dental therapy diploma at the School of Dental Therapy in 1979. She earned a Doctor of Dental Medicine degree from the University of Manitoba in 1990.

Career
A dentist by profession, and a Cree woman, she has spent much of her career working to provide dental and medical services to northern and Indigenous communities in Manitoba and Saskatchewan.

She was appointed to the Senate by Prime Minister Justin Trudeau on December 4, 2017.

On May 6, 2021 she was named Chancellor of Brandon University. She is the first Indigenous woman to hold the post.

References

Canadian senators from Manitoba
Women members of the Senate of Canada
Independent Canadian senators
Living people
21st-century Canadian politicians
21st-century Canadian women politicians
Indigenous Canadian senators
Cree people
Canadian dentists
1952 births
Independent Senators Group
University of Manila alumni